"Don't Cry" is a 1991 power ballad by Guns N' Roses.

Don't Cry may also refer to:

Music
 "Don't Cry" (Édith Piaf song), 1951
 "Don't Cry" (Asia song), 1983
 "Don't Cry" (Seal song), 1995
 "Don't Cry" (Human Nature song), 1999
 "Don't Cry" (Kaye Styles and Johnny Logan song), 2006
 "Don't Cry" (Lil Wayne song), 2018
 "Don't Cry", a song from the 1956 musical The Most Happy Fella
 "Don't Cry", a 2019 song by Ruel from Free Time
 "Don't Cry", a 1963 song by Mark Wynter
 "Don't Cry", a 1964 song by Brian Poole
 "Don't Cry", a 1982 song by Budgie from Deliver Us from Evil
 "Don't Cry", a 1986 song by Ken Laszlo
 "Don't Cry", a 1989 song by Neil Young from Freedom
 "Don't Cry", a 2002 song by Kirk Franklin from The Rebirth of Kirk Franklin
 "Don't Cry", a 2006 song by J. Dilla from Donuts
"Don't Cry", a 2011 song by 2NE1 from 2NE1
"Don't Cry", a 2013 song by Britney Spears from Britney Jean

Other uses
Don't Cry (film), a short animated film by Hisham Zreiq
Don't Cry, a 2009 book by Mary Gaitskill
Don't Cry, a 2010 book by Beverly Barton